is a Japanese actor.

Career
Born in Kyoto, Kondō made his film debut in Shohei Imamura's The Pornographers in 1966.

Filmography

Films

Television

References

External links
 Official profile 

1942 births
Living people
Male actors from Kyoto Prefecture